The Xinshan Dam is a dam located in Anle District, Keelung, Taiwan. The dam supplies water to Keelung and New Taipei districts of Jinshan, Ruifang, Wanli and Xizhi Districts.

History
The dam was completed in 1980. The reservoir underwent expansion capacity in 1998 from 4 million m3 to 10 million m3.

Transportation
The dam is accessible west of Keelung Station of Taiwan Railways.

See also
 List of dams and reservoirs in Taiwan

References

1980 establishments in Taiwan
Buildings and structures in Keelung
Dams completed in 1980
Dams in Taiwan